The 2010 Black Reel Awards, which annually recognize and celebrate the achievements of black people in feature, independent and television films, took place in Washington, D.C. on February 12, 2010. Precious took home a record-breaking 7 wins, with The Princess and the Frog taking home two awards.

Winners and nominees
Winners are listed first and highlighted in bold.

References

Black Reel Awards
2009 film awards
2010 in American cinema
2010 awards in the United States